The Men's Malaysian Open Squash Championships 2014 is the men's edition of the 2014 Malaysian Open Squash Championships, which is a tournament of the PSA World Tour event International (prize money: $50,000). The event took place in Kuala Lumpur in Malaysia from 20 August to 23 August. Mohamed El Shorbagy won his first Malaysian Open trophy, beating Max Lee in the final.

Prize money and ranking points
For 2014, the prize purse was $50,000. The prize money and points breakdown is as follows:

Seeds

Draw and results

See also
Malaysian Open Squash Championships
Women's Malaysian Open Squash Championships 2014

References

External links
PSA Malaysian Open Squash Championships 2014 website
Malaysian Open Squash Championships 2014 Squashsite website

Squash tournaments in Malaysia
Malaysian Open Squash Championships
Malaysian Open Squash Championships
Malaysian Open Squash Championships